Vovchynets may refer to several places in Ukraine:

 Vovchynets, Ivano-Frankivsk
 Vovchynets, Dnistrovskyi Raion, Chernivtsi Oblast
 Vovchynets, Koziatyn Raion
 Vovchynets, a village in Lukivtsi, Vyzhnytsia Raion